Two-time defending champion David Wagner and his partner Andy Lapthorne defeated the other defending champion Sam Schröder and his partner Dylan Alcott in the final, 7–6(7–1), 4–6, [10–7] to win the quad doubles wheelchair tennis title at the 2021 French Open. With the win, Lapthorne completed the career Grand Slam.

Schröder and Wagner were the defending champions, but did not participate together.

Draw

Finals

References

 Draw

Wheelchair Quad Doubles
French Open, 2021 Quad Doubles